Johan Laurentius Helenus Börjeson (30 December 1835 – 29 January 1910) was a Swedish sculptor. Börjeson studied in Rome and Paris. He was a professor at Royal Swedish Academy of Arts in Stockholm 1886–1907.

Gallery

References
Nationalencyklopedien (in Swedish)

1835 births
1910 deaths
Swedish male sculptors
20th-century Swedish sculptors
19th-century sculptors